Ryo Kato (Japanese: 加藤亮; born 20 August 1991) is a Japanese footballer who plays as a defender or midfielder for Basara Mainz.

Career

In 2014, Kato signed for German fifth division side Sportfreunde Siegen from Fontana Finthen in the German sixth division.

Before the second half of 2015/16, he signed for Montenegrin club Titograd, helping them win the league.

Before the second half of 2016/17, he signed for Kamza in the Albanian second division.

In 2018, Kato signed for German fifth division team Basara Mainz.

References

External links
 

Living people
1991 births
Japanese footballers
Association football midfielders
Association football defenders
Expatriate footballers in Albania
Expatriate footballers in Germany
Japanese expatriate footballers
Kategoria e Parë players
OFK Titograd players
FC Kamza players
Regionalliga players
Sportfreunde Siegen players
Japanese expatriate sportspeople in Germany
Montenegrin First League players
Japanese expatriate sportspeople in Montenegro
Japanese expatriate sportspeople in Albania
Expatriate footballers in Montenegro